The Mercury Ballroom is a music venue in downtown Louisville, Kentucky. The 900-capacity venue, housed in the Wright and Taylor Building at Fourth and Chestnut streets, operated by Live Nation's House of Blues Entertainment division.

See also
 List of attractions and events in the Louisville metropolitan area

References

External links
 

Arts venues in Louisville, Kentucky
Music venues in Kentucky
Tourist attractions in Louisville, Kentucky
2014 establishments in Kentucky